Willmot may refer to:

Places
 Willmot, New South Wales

People
 Ernest Willmot Sloper (born Ernest Willmott; 1871–1916), British-born South African architect
 Donald G. Willmot (1916–1994), Canadian businessman and philanthropist
 George Willmot (1908–1977), British archaeologist and museum curator